{|
{{Infobox ship image
|Ship image=La Muiron 928 GB.jpg
|Ship caption=1/72 Scale model of the Carrères sister ship, the Muiron, on display at the Musée national de la Marine
}}

|}Carrère was a French frigate that served briefly in the French navy before the British captured her in 1801, naming her HMS Carrere. She seems never to have seen any meaningful active duty after her capture as she was laid up in 1802 and finally sold in 1814.

French service
Carrère was one of two 38-gun frigates that were building on the stocks in Venice in May 1797, when Napoleon took the city during the Campaign of Italy. Pierre-Alexandre Forfait ordered the two frigates completed, which they were in August 1797 under the names Carrère and Muiron. The French named Carrère after an esteemed artillery colonel who had fallen at Unzmarkt fighting the Austrians.

Carrère and Muiron both served during the French invasion of Egypt in 1798. They then accompanied Napoleon on his return to France after the failure of that campaign. The captain of the Carrère was Commodore Pierre Dumanoir le Pelley, and with him travelled generals Lannes, Murat, and Marmont.

Capture
The British Pomone of 48 guns, in company with Phoenix and Pearl, captured Carrère near Elba on 3 August 1801 after a short fight. She was escorting a small convoy from Porto Ercole to Porto Longone during the Siege of Porto Ferrajo. Pomone lost two men killed and four wounded, of whom two died later. The French casualty list was not initially available.

The Royal Navy took her in as HMS Carrere, but rated at 36 guns. Frederick Lewis Maitland was her first captain. He sailed her to Portsmouth, where she arrived on 24 September 1802.

Fate
Carrères active duty career in the Royal Navy was short. She was paid off on 4 October 1802 and then laid up in ordinary. She was sold on 1 September 1814. The purchasers had to post a bond of £3000 that they would not sell or otherwise dispose of her but would break her up within 12 months from the day of sale.

Citations and referencesCitationsReferences'''
 Thiers, Adolphe, and Shoberl, Frederic (trans.), The History of the French Revolution, D.Appleton publisher, 1866
 James, William (1826) The naval history of Great Britain, from declaration of war by France in February 1793, to the accession of George IV in January 1820. (London: Harding, Lepard and Co.).
 
 Urban, Sylvanus, The Gentleman's Magazine'', Vol.XXXI January to June, John Bowyer Nichols and Sons., London, 1849
 

Age of Sail frigates of France
Ships built in Venice
Frigates of the Royal Navy
Frigates of the French Navy
Captured ships
1801 ships